World Informatix Cyber Security is an organisation focusing on the cyber security aspect of developing countries. The company caught attention for handling a high-profile case of Bangladesh Bank robbery. The organisation assisted and advised the bank to make remediation measures post-breach. World Informatix Cyber Security later brought in FireEye to perform forensic analysis of the heist.

The primary focus of the organisation is to work with Society for Worldwide Interbank Financial Telecommunication aka SWIFT as part of their customer security platform and to perform incident response in case of security breaches. World Informatix has also been involved in numerous incident response, breach and remediation projects for Central Banks, Financial Institutions and NGOs.

References 

Computer security companies
Companies with year of establishment missing